Chrysotrichaceae is a family of lichenized fungi in the order Arthoniales. Member of this family have a widespread distribution, but are especially prevalent in tropical areas. "Chrysothrichaceae" and "Chrysothricaceae" are alternative spellings that have been used in some older publications; the latter was used by Alexander Zahlbruckner in the protologue publication. Both of these spellings are considered incorrect, and the current spelling has been formalised following a proposal for conservation of Chrysotrichaceae against Pulverariaceae (an earlier synonym).

Genera
 Byssocaulon  – 1 sp.
 Chrysothrix  – ca. 18 spp.
 Galbinothrix  – 1 sp.
 Melarthonis  – 1 sp.

References

Arthoniomycetes
Lichen families
Taxa named by Alexander Zahlbruckner
Taxa described in 1905